Maria Glebovna Timofeeva (born 18 November 2003) is a Russian tennis player.

Timofeeva has career-high WTA rankings of 234 in singles and 179 in doubles. In July 2021, she won the $60k President's Cup in Nur-Sultan, Kazakhstan, alongside Alina Charaeva. Timofeeva has won five singles and six doubles titles on the ITF Women's Circuit.

ITF finals

Singles: 7 (5 titles, 2 runner–ups)

Doubles: 14 (6 titles, 8 runner-ups)

References

External links
 
 

2003 births
Living people
Russian female tennis players
21st-century Russian women